Hon. Sir John Duncan Bligh KCB, DL (11 October 1798 – 8 May 1872) was a British diplomat.

Background
Born in London, he was the second son of John Bligh, 4th Earl of Darnley and his wife, Elizabeth, the third daughter of William Brownlow. His mother was the aunt of Charles Brownlow, 1st Baron Lurgan and his older brother was Edward Bligh, 5th Earl of Darnley. Bligh was educated at Eton College and then matriculated at  Christ Church, Oxford on 6 May 1818. He received a BA in 1821. He was later elected a fellow of All Souls College, Oxford, where he received a BCL in 1828 and a DCL in 1836.

Career
Bligh entered the diplomatic service and was sent as attaché to the embassy in Vienna in 1820. Three years later he was transferred to Paris and in 1826 a special mission led him to Russia, where he attended the coronation of Emperor Nicholas I. Afterwards he returned to France and became secretary of legation in Florence in 1829. In the following year Bligh was attached to The Hague as secretary of embassy. He served as envoy ad interim from July 1832 and came to St Petersburg in September, acting as ambassador.

Bligh was promoted to Envoy Extraordinary and Minister Plenipotentiary to the King of Sweden and Norway in 1835 and when King William IV of the United Kingdom died and thereby Hanover's personal union with Great Britain ended, he was admitted as new Envoy Extraordinary and Minister Plenipotentiary to the King of Hanover in 1838. After nine years, he took over also the British diplomatic representation in the Grand Duchy of Oldenburg and the Duchy of Brunswick. Bligh retired in 1856 and on this occasion was awarded a Knight Commander of the Order of the Bath.

In 1831, Bligh was appointed a captain in the Royal East Kent Yeomanry and in 1857, he was nominated a Deputy Lieutenant of the county of Kent.

Family
On 19 December 1835, he married Elizabeth Mary, the only daughter of Thomas Gisborne at the parish church of Allestree. Their only child, a daughter was named after her mother and became later wife of Walter Pelham, 4th Earl of Chichester. Elizabeth died two years later and Bligh remained a widower until 1865, when he remarried his cousin Anne Julia, fourth daughter of Francis Brownlow at Ardbraccan Rectory on 28 November. Bligh died at Sandgate, Kent in 1872 and was survived by his second wife for ten years.

Cricket
In 1822, Bligh played for the Marylebone Cricket Club (MCC) in a first-class match, batting twice and scoring 2 each time. Numerous members of his family were involved in cricket.

Notes

References

1798 births
1872 deaths
John Duncan
Alumni of Christ Church, Oxford
Deputy Lieutenants of Kent
Fellows of All Souls College, Oxford
Knights Commander of the Order of the Bath
People educated at Eton College
Younger sons of earls
Ambassadors of the United Kingdom to Sweden
Ambassadors of the United Kingdom to Russia
Ambassadors of the United Kingdom to the Netherlands
English cricketers
English cricketers of 1787 to 1825
Royal East Kent Yeomanry officers
Marylebone Cricket Club Second 9 with 3 Others cricketers